"Super Gut" is a 1994 single recorded by Italian dance act Mo-Do. It was released as the second single from their 1995 album, Was Ist Das?. The song reached number 1 in Finland and was a notable hit in many European countries like Austria, Belgium, Germany, Sweden and Switzerland. On the Eurochart Hot 100, "Super Gut" peaked at number 19. It was released via various labels: Plastika, ZYX Music, Hit Plus, Scorpio Music.

Music video
The music video for "Super Gut" was directed by Giuseppe Capotondi. Capotondi also directed the music video for "Eins, Zwei, Polizei".

Track listing

Chart performance

Weekly charts

References

External links

1994 singles
German-language songs
Mo-Do songs
Number-one singles in Finland
1994 songs
Music videos directed by Giuseppe Capotondi